Dardanus may refer to:

Greek mythology 
 Dardanus (son of Zeus), the son of Zeus and Electra, and ancestor of the Trojans
 Dardanus (Scythian king), a Scythian king, and the father of Idaea who was the wife of King Phineus
, mythical ancestor of Dardani
 Dardanus, the Trojan son of Bias, killed by Achilles

People 
Dardanus of Athens, a Stoic philosopher, c. 100 BC
Caius Posthumus Dardanus, a praetorian prefect of Gaul from the early fifth century
Dardanus, addressee of a letter by Saint Jerome; see Jerome#Letters

Music 
Dardanus (Rameau), an opera in five acts by Jean-Philippe Rameau
Dardanus (Sacchini), an opera in four acts by Antonio Sacchini

Drama 
Dardanus, a lost play by the Greek comic poet Menander
Dardanus, a lost play by the Roman comic poet Caecilius Statius

Animals 
Dardanus (crustacean), a genus of hermit crabs belonging to the family Diogenidae
Papilio dardanus, a swallowtail butterfly

Other 
Dardanus (city), an ancient city on the coast of the Hellespont, where the Treaty of Dardanos was signed

See also
Dardanos (disambiguation)
Dardan (disambiguation)